2016–17 Hong Kong Senior Challenge Shield (officially known as 2016–17 HKFA Canbo Senior Shield due to sponsorship reasons) was the 115th season of one of the Asian oldest football knockout competitions, Hong Kong Senior Challenge Shield. 11 teams entered this edition, with three games being played in First Round before the Quarter-final stage. The competition was only open to teams that played in the 2016–17 Hong Kong Premier League.

Kitchee won the final over Eastern.

Calendar

Bracket
{{4RoundBracket-Byes
| RD1=First Round
| RD2=Quarter-finals
| RD3=Semi-finals
| RD4=Final
| RD4b=

| team-width=14em
| score-width=3em
| score-align=

| RD1-team03= Rangers
| RD1-score03= 0 (3)
| RD1-team04= Pegasus
| RD1-score04= 0 (4)| RD1-team07= Yuen Long
| RD1-score07= 0
| RD1-team08= Tai Po| RD1-score08= 1| RD1-team11= R&F
| RD1-score11= 0
| RD1-team12= Biu Chun Glory Sky| RD1-score12= 1| RD1-team15=
| RD1-score15=
| RD1-team16=
| RD1-score16=

| RD2-team01= Kitchee| RD2-score01= 3| RD2-team02= Pegasus
| RD2-score02= 0

| RD2-team03= South China
| RD2-score03= 0
| RD2-team04= Tai Po| RD2-score04= 1

| RD2-team05= Eastern| RD2-score05= 4| RD2-team06= Biu Chun Glory Sky
| RD2-score06= 1

| RD2-team07= Southern| RD2-score07= 5| RD2-team08= HKFC
| RD2-score08= 1

| RD3-team01= Kitchee| RD3-score01= 2| RD3-team02= Tai Po
| RD3-score02= 1 

| RD3-team03= Eastern| RD3-score03= 1| RD3-team04= Southern
| RD3-score04= 0

| RD4-team01= Kitchee| RD4-score01= 2| RD4-team02= Eastern
| RD4-score02= 1
}}Bold''' = winner
* = after extra time, = penalty shootout score

Fixtures and results

First round

Quarter-finals

Semi-finals

Final

References

External links
 Senior Shield - Hong Kong Football Association

2016-17
Shield
2016–17 domestic association football cups